Christmas is the name of the 2001 English-language holiday themed album by contemporary Christian singer Jaci Velasquez. The album was released under Word Entertainment. She toured in November and December 2001 to support the album. A Spanish-langue version of the album, Navidad, was released November 6, 2001.

Description and reviews

Velasquez described the album, "For my ideal Christmas album, I wanted to record the songs I have always loved, done in their original arrangements, to make an album that will sound good now but will also sound good years from now." The related review indicated that it blends traditional 1950s style arrangements with the pop Velasquez had come to be known for. Reviewer John DiBiase called it "a creative, fun, traditional Christmas project that will touch the hearts of all ages" and "one of the best-orchestrated Christmas projects put out in the contemporary Christian music to date."

AllMusic gave the album 3 out of 5 stars saying it is "beautifully orchestrated with touches of traditional Christmas-style jazz and contemporary pop."

Charts
The album peaked on the Billboard 200 at No. 102 and No. 6 on Billboards Top Contemporary Christian Albums charts.

 Track listing Notes'
 The album contains three original tracks (including "The Angel Song") plus a series of covers of Christmas classics.

Singles
 "The Chipmunk Song (Christmas Don't Be Late)" duet with Alvin and the Chipmunks
 "Feliz Navidad"
 "The First Noel"

Charts

Weekly charts

References

Jaci Velasquez albums
2001 Christmas albums
Christmas albums by American artists